Isla Ñ Rum is a line of premium rums made in Tucumán, Argentina. The main characteristics of the brand include batch distillation, copper stills and French oak maturing.

The product line includes:

Isla Ñ White Rum: Rated 86 points by “Bar & Drinks” Magazine in a blind tasting at the Argentine Sommeliers School
Isla Ñ Gold Rum
Isla Ñ Coconut Rum
Isla Ñ Lemon Rum

Rums
Argentine brands